During the 1920–21 English football season, Brentford competed in the Football League Third Division. It was Brentford's inaugural season in the Football League and ended with the club successfully applying for re-election.

Season summary

After 18 seasons as members of the Southern League, Brentford were named as founder members of the new Football League Third Division for the 1920–21 campaign. In preparation, 11 new players were signed and £2,000 was spent on improvements to Griffin Park. Despite flirting with a position in mid-table during August and September 1920, the club endured a torrid season, sinking to the re-election places by October and largely remaining there for the rest of the season. The FA Cup was exited in the first round. Brentford successfully applied for re-election to the Football League at the end of the season without going to a poll. Three directors resigned after the season, due to a deficit of nearly £6,000 (equivalent to £ in ).

The goalscoring of former Arsenal forward Harry King provided one of the rare bright spots of the season, with his 18 goals accounting for nearly half that of the team's total. King also became the first Brentford player to register a Football League hat-trick in a 5–0 thrashing of Grimsby Town on 28 March 1921, the Bees' biggest win of the season. The result established the club record for the highest winning margin in a Football League match, which would stand until broken in September 1929. Secretary manager Fred Halliday stood down after the season and reverted to an administrative role within the club. Management adviser Billy Brawn also stepped down. Brentford's 9 league victories during the season is the joint-fewest in the club's history and Jimmy Hodson became the club's record-oldest player when he appeared in the final match of the season at age 40 years, 8 months and two days.

League table

Results
Brentford's goal tally listed first.

Legend

Football League Third Division

FA Cup

 Sources: Statto, 100 Years of Brentford, The Complete History

Playing squad 
Players' ages are as of the opening day of the 1920–21 season.

 Sources: 100 Years of Brentford, Timeless Bees, Football League Players' Records 1888 to 1939

Coaching staff

Statistics

Appearances and goals

Players listed in italics left the club mid-season.
Source: 100 Years of Brentford

Goalscorers 

Players listed in italics left the club mid-season.
Source: 100 Years of Brentford

Management

Summary

Transfers & loans 
Cricketers are not included in this list.

References 

Brentford F.C. seasons
Brentford